Popek is a Polish surname. Notable people with the surname include:

Gerald J. Popek (1946-2008), American computer scientist
Jacek Popek (born 1978), Polish football player
Mark Popek (born 1990), American football player
Tadeusz Popek (1915-1942), World War II Polish resistance member

See also
Popek (born 1978), Polish rapper and mixed martial arts fighter
Popeck (born 1936), French comedian

Polish-language surnames